The Orcutt Union School District is located in Santa Barbara County on the central coast of California. There are six elementary schools, two middle schools, and one charter school, which first began on August 20, 2008. There are approximately 5,040 students and more than 500 staff members.
http://www.orcuttschools.net/

Junior high schools

Orcutt Junior High School
Lakeview Junior High School

Elementary schools

Olga Reed Elementary School
Alice Shaw Elementary School
Pine Grove Elementary School
Patterson Road Elementary School
Ralph Dunlap Elementary School
Joe Nightingale Elementary School

Charter school

Orcutt Academy

Former school

May Grisham Elementary School

References

External links
 
 Santa Barbara County Education Office

School districts in Santa Barbara County, California